Michiyoshi (written: 道由, 道義, 道美 or 通芳) is a masculine Japanese given name. Notable people with the name include:

, Japanese film director
, Japanese professional wrestler and mixed martial artist
, Japanese shogi player
, Japanese politician

Japanese masculine given names